Estaline Schoolhouse is a historic one-room school building located at Estaline Valley, Augusta County, Virginia. It was built in 1909, and is a one-story, rectangular frame building with a gable roof.  It measures 31 feet by 21 feet. The school closed soon after World War II.

It was listed on the National Register of Historic Places in 1985.

References

One-room schoolhouses in Virginia
School buildings on the National Register of Historic Places in Virginia
School buildings completed in 1909
Schools in Augusta County, Virginia
National Register of Historic Places in Augusta County, Virginia
1909 establishments in Virginia